Karen Dianne Baldwin (born September 6, 1963) is a Canadian actress, TV host and beauty queen who was crowned Miss Universe 1982. She is the first Canadian to win the Miss Universe title.

Early life
Baldwin was born in London, Ontario. Her father William is president of a real estate agency. Her mother Marion is a real estate broker. She has two brothers. Before becoming Miss Universe, she attended London Central Secondary School in London, Ontario.

Miss Universe
Baldwin was the winner of the 1982 Miss Canada pageant and was crowned Miss Universe in Lima, Peru. She then relinquished her crown to Lorraine Downes the following year in the United States.

Life after Miss Universe
She hosted The New You, a Canadian fashion and lifestyle television program and was one of the co-hosts for the 1989 Miss Universe pageant, held in Cancun, Mexico.

She was also featured in the comedy movie Who's That Girl starring Madonna and Griffin Dunne as "Heather", one of the kidnapped bridesmaids and she appeared in the movies: Spellbinder, Night Eyes, Last Call, T-Force and Sudden Death.

She works as a realtor for Baldwin Scott Thomas Team in Calabasas California.

Personal life
She married actor Jack Scalia in 1987 and they had two daughters. They were divorced in 1996. Her second husband is Nicholas Karazissis.

References

1963 births
Actresses from London, Ontario
Canadian beauty pageant winners
Canadian expatriate actresses in the United States
Canadian film actresses
Canadian people of Irish descent
Canadian women screenwriters
Living people
Miss Canada winners
Miss Universe 1982 contestants
Miss Universe winners
Writers from London, Ontario